Arga is a rural locality (a station) in Sosnovsky Selsoviet of Seryshevsky District, Amur Oblast, Russia. The population was 568 as of 2018. There are 13 streets.

Geography 
Arga is located 23 km northwest of Seryshevo (the district's administrative centre) by road. Ozyornoye is the nearest rural locality.

References 

Rural localities in Seryshevsky District